San Francisco Park were a Cuban baseball team in the Cuban League based in Havana. They played in the winter of 1915–1916.

References

Defunct baseball teams in Cuba
Cuban League teams